Adriano Frassinelli (born 11 April 1943) is an Italian bobsledder who competed in the late 1960s and early 1970s. He won the silver medal in the four-man event at the 1972 Winter Olympics in Sapporo.

He won a gold medal in the two-man event at the 1969 FIBT World Championships in Lake Placid, New York.

References
 Bobsleigh four-man Olympic medalists for 1924, 1932-56, and since 1964

External links 
 
 
 

1943 births
Living people
Italian male bobsledders
Olympic bobsledders of Italy
Olympic silver medalists for Italy
Olympic medalists in bobsleigh
Bobsledders at the 1972 Winter Olympics
Medalists at the 1972 Winter Olympics